This is a list of records and statistics of the FIFA Arab Cup.

Debut of national teams

Overall team records
In this ranking 3 points are awarded for a win, 1 for a draw and 0 for a loss. As per statistical convention in football, matches decided in extra time are counted as wins and losses, while matches decided by penalty shoot-outs are counted as draws. Teams are ranked by total points, then by goal difference, then by goals scored.

Notes

Medal table
 Jordan and Morocco shared bronze in 2002.

Comprehensive team results by tournament
Legend

 – Champions
 – Runners-up
 – Third place
 – Fourth place
 – Semi-final (no third place match)

GS – Group stage
Q — Qualified for upcoming tournament
 — Did not qualify
 — Did not participate
 — Hosts

For each tournament, the number of teams in each finals tournament are shown (in parentheses).

Results by confederation

General statistics by tournament

Most tournaments hosted 
All tournaments were played in Asia.

References

records and statistics
International association football competition records and statistics